Okuyama Dam  is a gravity dam located in Hiroshima Prefecture in Japan. The dam is used for irrigation. The catchment area of the dam is 1.4 km2. The dam impounds about 3  ha of land when full and can store 291 thousand cubic meters of water. The construction of the dam was started on 1991 and completed in 2009.

References

Dams in Hiroshima Prefecture